Upminster Windmill is a Grade II* listed smock mill located in Upminster in the London Borough of Havering, England. It was formerly known as Abraham's Mill and was in Essex when built. It has been restored and is a museum open to the public at selected times.

History
Although there had been a windmill in Upminster since at least 1768, this mill was built for James Nokes of Hunt's Farm in Corbets Tey Road in 1803 on land transferred from Bridge House Farm which was owned by his brother William. It had four Common sails and drove three pairs of millstones. A steam engine was added early in 1811 driving two pairs of millstones, an action which increased the rateable value of the mill from £30 to £77. A fourth pair of millstones was added to the mill. James Nokes died in 1838 and the mill passed to his son Thomas. A fifth pair of millstones had been added by 1849 when Thomas Nokes was bankrupt. By 1856 the mill was driving six pairs of millstones by wind and steam. Thomas Abraham purchased the mill in 1857, having previously been in the employ of Nokes at both West Thurrock windmill and Upminster. He had also been in business at a steam mill in Navestock for the previous two years. In 1876, the Upright Shaft was broken in an accident at the mill. It was repaired with a cast-iron coupling.

Thomas Abraham died in 1882 and the mill passed to John Arkell Abraham. In 1889 the mill was struck by lightning and on 5 January 1900 the windshaft snapped at the neck and the sails crashed to the ground. A windshaft from a post mill near Maldon was fitted along with four new sails. After the death of John Arkell Abraham, the mill passed to his nephews Thomas, Alfred and Clement. In 1927 a stock was replaced and the fantail repaired. The mill last worked commercially in 1934 and was purchased for £3,400 by W H Simmonds. The steam driven machinery was sold and the associated outbuildings decayed and were eventually demolished. The mill was subsequently purchased by Essex County Council in the late 1930s, and was listed in 1955

On 22 June 2004, the Upminster Windmill Preservation Trust were granted a 35-year lease on the mill. On 18 January 2007, the windmill suffered damage in extremely high winds. The stock sustained damage as did the sail, but there was little other damage to the mill. Two new sails were fitted by Vincent Pargeter in August 2008.

Description
The mill has a four-storey smock on a single-storey brick base. There is a stage at first-floor level. It has a boat-shaped cap with a gallery, winded by a six-bladed fantail. Four Patent sails are carried on a cast-iron windshaft. The mill drives four pairs of millstones by wind.

Base

Smock
The main floor beams are  square at all levels except the dust floor.

Cap and fantail

The cap is thought to be the work of the millwright William Bear of Ballingdon and is unusual in having an external gallery. The fantail consists of six wooden vanes set at right-angles to the sails, and has the year 1799 carved on the horizontal wooden beam beneath it.

Sails and windshaft

The octagonal cast-iron windshaft has two square sections to take a Head Wheel and Tail Wheel as was its intended purpose in a post mill, and was moved to Upminster from a post mill near Maldon in 1899 to replace one broken during a storm. It carries a  diameter composite Brake Wheel with eight cast-iron arms and six wooden cants. The Brake Wheel has 78 cogs. The neck bearing of the windshaft is a roller bearing, fitted after the mill ceased working commercially.

Originally Upminster windmall had canvas sails, but the sails on the mill when it ceased working commercially were four double Patent sails. Each sail had twelve bays with three shutters per bay, giving a total of 288 shutters, each carved with a number in Roman numerals to indicate its location. The weather on the sails was 23˚ at the heel and almost 0˚ at the tip.

Machinery

The Upright Shaft is wooden, in two sections for reasons noted above. The Wallower is of compass arm construction,  diameter with 43 cogs. At the bottom of the Upright shaft the  diameter compass arm Great Spur Wheel has 126 cogs. It drives four pairs of underdrift millstones via stone nuts with 24 cogs.

The millstones are three pairs of French Burr stones and one pair of Peak stones. Two pairs of the French Burr stones are  diameter and the other two pairs of millstones are  diameter.

Steam engine
The steam engine was located in a brick building built against the north-east side of the windmill, and drove two pairs of millstones, a centrifugal governor, and a sack hoist. The steam driven millstones were located on 2 levels and driven by a  square shaft of  length, those on the upper floor being driven by a cast-iron bevel wheel with wooden cog inserts. It was also able to work various dressing machines in the windmill, but not the wind driven stones. There is some difference over the exact type of engine, it being variously described as a grasshopper engine built by Napiers, and a Cornish boiler by Davey Paxman & Co. Both sources agree that the engine had formerly been used in a  Thames steamboat. The steam engine itself was removed in 1940 and taken to South West Essex Technical College in Walthamstow, while the building and remaining contents were removed in 1960 with two of the millstones remaining at the windmill entrance.

Millers
James Nokes 1803–1838
Thomas Nokes 1838–1849
Thomas Abraham 1857–1882
John Arkell Abraham 1882–1912
Thomas, Alfred and Clement Abraham 1912–1934

References for above:-

Location
The mill is located in a small open space maintained by Havering Council, known as Windmill Field on St Mary's Lane. The nearest tube stations are Upminster Bridge tube station and Upminster station. Views from the top of the windmill include Canary Wharf and the transmitter at Crystal Palace.

References

External links

 
 Havering London Borough Council website history of the windmill
 Windmill World webpage on Abraham's Mill
 Photos of the restoration work
 The Assembly's "Never Never" music video – filmed at Upminster Windmill
 Aerial video of Upminster Windmill

Windmills in London
Grade II* listed buildings in the London Borough of Havering
Smock mills in England
Grinding mills in the United Kingdom
Windmills completed in 1803
Museums in the London Borough of Havering
History of the London Borough of Havering
Octagonal buildings in the United Kingdom
Mill museums in England